Lucky Feller is a British television sitcom written by Terence Frisby and produced by Humphrey Barclay. It was broadcast on ITV in 1976. The series stars David Jason and ran for one series of 13 episodes.

The series is about two plumber brothers who live in Brockley, South East London. The basic set-up can be compared to Only Fools and Horses, except with David Jason playing the Rodney part, Bernard 'Shorty' Mepstead. The elder brother, Randolph 'Randy' Mepstead, is played by Peter Armitage (Nicky Henson in the pilot episode). Shorty is naive, hopeful and in love with a girl named Kathleen Peake (Cheryl Hall). She is sexually infatuated with – and thinks she is pregnant by – Randy. Despite her attraction to Randy, she becomes engaged to Shorty and has to bed him before the end of the series so that he will believe that he is the father. But despite her best attempts, and Shorty's feelings for her, the consummation never happens. In the final episode, it becomes clear that Kath is not pregnant.

Guest stars include Pat Heywood, Prunella Scales and Mike Grady as well as Burt Kwouk and Saeed Jaffrey. The show was directed by both Gerry Mill and Mike Vardy and location sequences were mainly filmed in and around South London. The show was offered a second series; however writer Terence Frisby did not feel he had enough ideas for the series to continue, so the show ended with the thirteenth and final episode.

The complete series was released on DVD on 22 September 2014 and was repeated on Gold in 2017, 2018 and 2019.

Episode list

External links

1976 British television series debuts
1976 British television series endings
1970s British sitcoms
Casual sex in television
English-language television shows
ITV sitcoms
London Borough of Lewisham
London Weekend Television shows
Pregnancy-themed television shows
Television series about brothers
Television series about dysfunctional families
Television series by ITV Studios
Television shows set in London